Paraná-Uruguaiana pipeline (also: Transportadora de Gas del Mercosur) is a natural gas pipeline from Aldea Brasilera, Paraná in Argentina to Uruguaiana in Brazil.

History
The pipeline was constructed by Techint. Construction started in August 1999 and the pipeline became operational in July 2000.  It was inaugurated by presidents of Brazil and Argentina, Fernando Henrique Cardoso and Fernando de la Rúa on 18 August 2000 at Paso de los Libres.

Technical description
The pipeline cost US$250 million. 

The pipeline supplies natural gas to a 600-MW power plant in Uruguaiana.  There is a plan to extend the pipeline from Uruguaiana to Porto Alegre.

Operator
The Argentine section is operated by Transportadora de Gas de Mercosur. This is a joint venture of Techint, Total S.A., Petronas, Compañia General de Combustibles, and CMS Energy.  The Brazilian section is operated by Transportadora Sul Brasileira de Gas, a joint venture of Gaspetro (subsidiary of Petrobras), Petroleo Ipiranga, Repsol YPF, and Techint.

See also

 Cruz del Sur pipeline
 GasAndes Pipeline
 GASENE
 GASBOL
 Yabog pipeline

References

Energy infrastructure completed in 2000
Natural gas pipelines in Argentina
Natural gas pipelines in Brazil
Argentina–Brazil relations